Ghazi Baker  (born 1967 in Beirut, Lebanon) is a Lebanese architect and contemporary visual artist working in painting, drawing, sculpture and printmaking. He lives and works in Beirut.

Work
Baker's work is highly sought-after by collectors in the Middle East, Europe and elsewhere. His work is present in institutional and foundation collections in Beirut, Dubai, Paris, New York and other locations.

Baker's style could be characterized as an exotic cocktail of lines, post-structuralist art, cerebral and deliberately anti-thematic. Always looking to highlight the process itself, his artistic influences include comic book art, music, movies, motorcycle culture, esoteric imagery, everyday life and the human condition.

Selected exhibitions
Beirut – Lebanon | 18 Nov 2014 "Decade-nce" Ghazi Baker solo exhibition
Beirut – Lebanon | 15 Nov 2016 "Sins, Virtues & Colors" Solo show, mark Hachem gallery.
Istanbul – Turkey | 11 March 2016 Contemporary Istanbul Art Fair
Beirut – Lebanon | 21 Sep 2016 Beirut Art Fair 2016
Miami – USA | 29 Nov 2016 Miami Art fair 2016
Palm Beach – USA | 1 December 2017 Palm Beach modern & contemporary 2017
Paris – France | 20 Jan 2017 Artists Collective, Mark Hachem Gallery Paris.
Wynwood -USA | 16 Feb 2017 Art Wynwood 2017
New York – USA | 3 February 2017 Scope New York 2017
Paris – France | 5 December 2017 Collective exhibition Mark Hachem Gallery Paris
Basel – Switzerland | 13 Jun 2017 Scope Basel 2017
Beirut – Lebanon | 21 Sep 2017 Beirut Art Fair 2017
Paris – France | 23 Nov 2017 " CHROMESTHESIA" Solo show, Mark Hachem Gallery, Paris.
Miami – USA | 12 May 2017 Scope Miami 2017
New York – USA | 3 August 2018 Scope New York 2018
Beirut - Lebanon | 28 March 2019 “Suspension of Disbelief” Ghazi Baker solo exhibition 
New York - USA | 10 March 2020 Volta New York 2020
Amsterdam - Netherlands | 15 September 2022 at the Rijksmuseum 
Miami - USA | 4 December 2022 Miami Art Fair 2022

References

Living people
Lebanese painters
Lebanese photographers
Lebanese contemporary artists
1967 births